The Balzo was a headdress worn by noblewomen of Italy in the 1530s. It was donut-shaped but appeared turban-like from the front, though it was generally worn further back from the forehead exposing the hair, unlike a period turban.

It is assumed as a fashion invention by Isabella d'Este, first documented in letters in 1509 and 1512 and well copied in later years. 

The headdress was a throwback to a larger rounded headdress from the 15th century in Italy that covered the hair of the wearer. Then the hairline was often plucked. Though mostly known as a woman's headdress, there is evidence that men also wore a form of the balzo.

References

History of clothing (Western fashion)
Headgear
Hats